Øystein "Pølsa" Pettersen (born 19 January 1983 in Linderud) is a former Norwegian cross-country skier, television personality and podcast host who competed professionally from 2002 to 2019. He has six World Cup podiums, his best finish being second in individual sprint events. Together with Petter Northug he won gold medal in the team sprint event at the 2010 Winter Olympics in Vancouver, Canada. In the Individual Sprint he was one of three Norwegians to reach the six-man final.

In 2020 he was a contestant in the celebrity edition of the norwegian TV show, 71° Nord and in 2021 he took part in Mesternes Mester. 

Pettersen also hosts his own podcast called Skipodden. A comedy style podcast about training and life, with an extra focus on winter sports. Skipodden has had many prominent guests including John Arne Riise, Marit Bjørgen, Gunde Svan and Petter Northug.

Athletic career
Pettersen began competing in national events in 2002 and in junior international events in 2003. Although he has competed in dozens of events, he only finished in the top three at World Cup events five times, including second-place finished in Germany in 2006 and in Estonia in 2009. He did not compete in the 2006 Winter Olympics, but did win a gold medal that year in the Scandinavian championships.

Pettersen was selected to join the Norwegian team at the 2010 Winter Olympics in Vancouver, Canada. In his first Olympic event, the individual sprint, he placed sixth, one of three Norwegians who made it to the final competition round. He later won a gold medal with teammate Petter Northug in the team sprint event in a close finish with teams from Germany and Russia. Originally, Pettersen was not going to compete in the event, but a last-minute withdrawal by world champion Ola Vigen Hattestad due to illness left a slot open, and Pettersen was chosen to fill it. A number of teams were in contention following Pettersen's performance during the first leg of the race, and it was not until the last hill that Northug passed his opponents and took the lead entering the stadium where the race finished.

Cross-country skiing results
All results are sourced from the International Ski Federation (FIS).

Olympic Games
 1 medal – (1 gold)

World Championships

World Cup

Season standings

Individual podiums

 6 podiums – (5 , 1 )

Team podiums

 1 victory – (1 ) 
 3 podiums – (1 , 2 )

References

External links
 
 
 

1983 births
Living people
Norwegian male cross-country skiers
Olympic cross-country skiers of Norway
Cross-country skiers at the 2010 Winter Olympics
Olympic gold medalists for Norway
Olympic medalists in cross-country skiing
Medalists at the 2010 Winter Olympics